Candi may refer to:
 Candi of Indonesia, an Indonesian word for stupa (Buddhist temple, also used for Hindu temples in Indonesia)
 Candi, Sidoarjo, a subdistrict of Sidoarjo, East Java, Indonesia
 Candi & The Backbeat, a Canadian dance band, initially known as just Candi
 Candi (webcomic)
 Candi, a character on Max & Ruby
 Chandi (Caṇḍī), Hindu Mother goddess
 An abbreviation for City and Islington College
 Candi sugar

People
 Candi Devine (born 1959), American professional wrestler
 Candi Kubeck (1961–1996), American airline pilot
 Candi Milo (born 1961), American voice actress and singer
 Candi Staton (born 1940), American soul and gospel singer
 Cesare Candi (1869–1947), Italian luthier
 Leonardo Candi (born 1997), Italian basketball player
 Oreste Candi (1865–1938), Italian luthier

See also
 Cande (disambiguation)
 Candi bentar, a classical Javanese and Balinese gateway entrance
 Candy (disambiguation)
 Kandi (disambiguation)
 Kandy (disambiguation)